This is a discography of Cavalleria rusticana, an opera  by Pietro Mascagni. It premiered at the Teatro Costanzi in Rome on 17 May 17, 1890. There have been over 100 full-length recordings of Cavalleria rusticana published since it was first recorded in Germany in 1909. Mascagni himself has conducted the opera in two recordings, the best-known of which is the 1940 EMI recording made to mark the 50th anniversary of the opera's premiere. The performance by the La Scala orchestra and chorus with Lina Bruna Rasa as Santuzza and Beniamino Gigli as Turiddu also has a spoken introduction by Mascagni. Originally released as an LP, it is available on CD under several historical recording labels, including Naxos.

Recordings

References

Further reading
For extensive annotated discographies of Cavalleria rusticana, see:
Flury, Roger (2001). Pietro Mascagni - A Bio-Bibliography. Greenwood Press. 
Mascagni.org. Cavalleria rusticana - Recorded Performances

Opera discographies
Operas by Pietro Mascagni